Daniel J. Sharfstein is a professor of law and history at Vanderbilt University and a legal scholar who has written books and articles about the legal history of the United States and African Americans as well as Oliver Otis Howard and the war against Nez Perce. He was a 2013 Guggenheim Fellow.

He graduated from Harvard College and then worked for 3 years as a journalist. He received his Juris Doctor degree from Yale Law School, clerked for judge Dorothy W. Nelson at the U.S. Court of Appeals for the Ninth Circuit and for judge Rya W. Zobel of the U.S. District Court for the District of Massachusetts. He was an associate at Strumwasser & Woocher, a public interest law firm in Santa Monica, California. 

He has written for the Yale Law Journal, Virginia Law Review, Minnesota Law Review, New York Times, Slate, and Legal Affairs.

He co-directs a social justice program at Yale. He gave the Edward L. Prichard lecture at the University of Kentucky in 2019.

In 2021 he was researching a book on New York's garment workers.

Selected Bibliography
 Winner of the Association of American Law Schools 2011 Scholarly Papers Competition. 
 Winner of the 2012 J. Anthony Lukas Book Prize for excellence in non-fiction, Law & Society Association 2012 James Willard Hurst Jr. Prize for socio-legal history, William Nelson Cromwell Book Prize from the American Society for Legal History, and the Chancellor’s Award for Research from Vanderbilt.

References

Year of birth missing (living people)
Living people
Harvard College alumni
Yale Law School alumni
Vanderbilt University Law School faculty